Guy Tréjan (1921–2001) was a French film, stage and television actor. He was the nephew of the Swiss singer and dancer Flore Revalles.

Selected filmography
 Marie Antoinette Queen of France (1956)
 I'll Get Back to Kandara (1956)
 Women's Club (1956)
 Escapade (1957)
 The Three Musketeers (1961)
 Heaven on One's Head (1965)
 Jo (1971)
 Night Flight from Moscow (1973)
 Piaf (1974)
 Conversation Piece (1974)
 La Bête (1975)
 Stranger in the House (1992)
 Fidelity (2000)
 The Officers' Ward (2001)

References

Bibliography
 Bradby, David. Modern French Drama 1940-1990. Cambridge University Press, 1991.

External links

1921 births
2001 deaths
French male film actors
French male stage actors
French male television actors
Male actors from Paris